NGC 1514 is a planetary nebula in the zodiac constellation of Taurus, positioned to the north of the star Psi Tauri along the constellation border with Perseus. Distance to the nebula is 466 pc, according to GAIA DR2 data.

It was discovered by William Herschel on November 13, 1790, describing it as "a most singular phenomenon" and forcing him to rethink his ideas on the construction of the heavens. Up until this point Herschel was convinced that all nebulae consisted of masses of stars too remote to resolve, but now here was a single star "surrounded with a faintly luminous atmosphere." He concluded: "Our judgement I may venture to say, will be, that the nebulosity about the star is not of a starry nature."

It consists of an outer shell, an inner shell, and bright blobs. The inner shell appears to be distorted, but was likely originally spherical. An alternative description is of "lumpy nebula composed of numerous small bubbles" with a somewhat filamentary structure in the outer shell. Infrared observations show a huge region of dust surrounds the planetary nebula, spanning . There is also a pair of rings forming what appears to be a diabolo-like structure, similar to those found in MyCn 18, but these are extremely faint and only visible in the mid-infrared, The combined mass of the gas and dust is estimated at  The ionized gas is moderately excited, and the electron temperature is estimated to be 15,000 K.

The nebula originated from a binary star system with the designation HD 281679 from the Henry Draper Catalogue. The bright, visible component is a giant star on the horizontal branch with a stellar classification of A0III, while the nebula-generating companion is now a hot, sub-luminous O-type star. The two were originally thought to have an orbital period on the order of 10 days, but observations of the system over years showed that their orbit is actually one of the longest known for any planetary nebula, with a period of about 9 years. Their orbital eccentricity is about 0.5.

References

External links

 Basic data on NGC 1514
 Discussion on the dynamics of the NGC 1514 system 

Planetary nebulae
1514
Taurus (constellation)
Discoveries by William Herschel